Charles L. Angell (May 17, 1929–May 15, 2014) was an American politician who served in the Kansas State Senate as a Republican from 1973 to 1984.

References

1929 births
2014 deaths
Republican Party Kansas state senators
People from Meade County, Kansas
20th-century American politicians